Dodia albertae is a moth of the family Erebidae first described by Harrison Gray Dyar Jr. in 1901. It is found in Canada, Siberia south to Mongolia, west to the Polar Urals. See the subspecies section for more information.

Adults are on wing from June to July depending on the location.

Subspecies
Dodia albertae albertae (mountainous areas of southern Siberia, northern Urals, southern Tamir peninsula, Yakutia, Magadan, Northern Mongolia, Alaska to Quebec, south to Calgary, Alberta along the Rocky Mountain foothills)
Dodia albertae atra (Bang-Haas, 1912) (mountainous areas of southern Siberia, Yakutia, southern Magadan, northern Mongolia)
Dodia albertae eudiopta Tshistjakov, 1988 (Polar Urals, Taimyr, north-west Yakutia)

References

Callimorphina
Moths of North America
Moths described in 1901